Wyndham St. John (30 May 1959 – 6 March 2023) was a Canadian equestrian. She competed in the individual eventing at the 2000 Summer Olympics.

St. John died in Andalucia, Spain on 6 March 2023, at the age of 63.

References

External links
 

1959 births
2023 deaths
Canadian female equestrians
Olympic equestrians of Canada
Equestrians at the 2000 Summer Olympics
Sportspeople from Vancouver